Brian Norton defeated Manuel Alonso 5–7, 4–6, 7–5, 6–3, 6–3 in the All Comers' Final, but the reigning champion Bill Tilden defeated Norton 4–6, 2–6, 6–1, 6–0, 7–5 in the challenge round to win the gentlemen's singles tennis title at the 1921 Wimbledon Championships.

Tilden was the last men's champion at the original Wimbledon location at Worple Road, and was also the last men's champion under the challenge round system. From 1922 onward the reigning champion, like every other player, would have to play from the beginning of the tournament instead of playing a single Challenge Round match against the winner of the all-comers tournament.

Draw

Challenge round

All-Comers' Finals

Top half

Section 1

Section 2

Section 3

Section 4

Bottom half

Section 5

Section 6

Section 7

Section 8

References

External links

Men's Singles
Wimbledon Championship by year – Men's singles